In American usage, an Easter egger or Easter-egger is any hybrid or mixed-breed chicken resulting from breeding of a bird carrying the blue-egg (oocyan) gene with one that lays brown eggs. Eggs from such a bird may be any shade of blue or brown, or occasionally pink or pale yellow. These birds do not constitute a breed, and so are not recognized by the American Poultry Association or the American Bantam Association. They may be marketed as "Americana", but are quite different from the Ameraucana, a recognized breed.

Characteristics 

Hybrid birds of this type may be of any color. They are commonly muffed and bearded, often with a pea-comb; the wattles may be small or entirely absent. The legs are often greenish.

References

Chicken crossbreeds